WLLW may refer to: 

 WLLW (FM), a radio station (101.7 FM) licensed to Geneva, New York, United States
 WFLK (FM), a radio station (99.3 FM) licensed to Seneca Falls, New York, United States, which used the call sign WLLW from 2000 to 2016
 WCIP (FM), a radio station (93.7 FM) licensed to Clyde, New York, United States, which used the call sign WLLW from 1995 to 2000